The 2001 LG Cup was a professional ranking snooker tournament that took place between 12 and 21 October 2001 at the Guild Hall in Preston, England. The highest break of the tournament was 147 made by Ronnie O'Sullivan.

Mark Williams was the defending champion, but he lost to Stephen Hendry in the quarter-finals. Stephen Lee defeated Peter Ebdon 9–4 in the final to win his second ranking title.

Tournament summary 

Defending champion Mark Williams was the number 1 seed with World Champion Ronnie O'Sullivan seeded 2. The remaining places were allocated to players based on the world rankings.

Main draw

Final

References

World Open (snooker)
LG Cup
LG Cup (snooker)